XHESR-FM is a radio station on 91.7 FM in Santa Rosalía, Baja California Sur.

History
XESR-AM 1320 received its concession on February 25, 1980. It was owned by Guadalupe Espinoza de Aréchiga and broadcast with 500 watts day and 250 at night. It was authorized to move to FM in December 2011.

References

Radio stations in Baja California Sur
Radio stations established in 1980
1980 establishments in Mexico